Nitrosylsulfuric acid is the chemical compound with the formula . It is a colourless solid that is used industrially in the production of caprolactam, and was formerly part of the lead chamber process for producing sulfuric acid. The compound is the mixed anhydride of sulfuric acid and nitrous acid.

In organic chemistry, it is used as a reagent for nitrosating, as a diazotizing agent, and as an oxidizing agent.

Synthesis and reactions
A typical procedure entails dissolving sodium nitrite in cold sulfuric acid:

It can also be prepared by the reaction of nitric acid and sulfur dioxide.

 is used in organic chemistry to prepare diazonium salts from amines, for example in the Sandmeyer reaction. Related NO-delivery reagents include nitrosonium tetrafluoroborate  and nitrosyl chloride.

In industry, the nitrosodecarboxylation reaction between nitrosylsulfuric acid and cyclohexanecarboxylic acid is used to generate caprolactam:

Safety
Nitrosylsulfuric acid is a hazardous material and precautions are indicated.

References

Acid anhydrides
Acids
Hydrogen compounds
Nitrosyl compounds
Sulfate esters
Sulfur oxoacids
Nitrogen(III) compounds